is a 1995 Japanese film directed by Yasuo Furuhata.

Awards
19th Japan Academy Prize
 Best Actress - Yūko Asano

References

External links
 

1995 films
Films directed by Yasuo Furuhata
Films scored by Takayuki Hattori
1990s Japanese films